Yevgeni Yuryevich Gavryuk (born 23 January 1987) is a Ukrainian professional football official and a former player. He also holds Russian citizenship. He works as a team director for the Under-19 squad of FC Torpedo Moscow.

External links
 
 

1987 births
Living people
Ukrainian footballers
Ukrainian expatriate footballers
Expatriate footballers in France
Expatriate footballers in Russia
FC Torpedo Moscow players
FC Fakel Voronezh players
FC Nizhny Novgorod (2007) players
FC Luch Vladivostok players
Association football forwards
FC Lokomotiv Moscow players
PFC Spartak Nalchik players
FC Sokol Saratov players
FC Khimik Dzerzhinsk players
FC Nosta Novotroitsk players
FC Sportakademklub Moscow players
FC Mashuk-KMV Pyatigorsk players